Baldev Singh (1902–1961) was an Indian Sikh politician and the first Minister of Defence of India.

Baldev Singh may also refer to:

 Baldev Singh (athlete), Indian Olympic athlete
 Baldev Singh (author) (born 1942), India Punjabi writer
 Baldev Singh (basketball) (born 1951), Indian Olympic basketball player
 Baldev Singh (field hockey) (born 1951), Indian Olympic hockey player
 Baldev Singh (Haryana politician)  (1889–1976), Indian politician from Haryana
 Baldev Singh (neurologist) (1904–1998), Indian neurologist
 Baldev Singh Aulakh (born 1964), Indian politician from Uttar Pradesh
 Baldev Singh Dhillon (born 1947), Indian agricultural scientist
 Baldev Singh Khaira Punjab MLA (2017-22)
 Baldev Singh Mann (1952–1986), Indian politician from Punjab
 Baldev Singh Tomar (born 1970), Indian politician from  Himachal Pradesh